3 Nafas Likas is an Indonesian drama film produced by Oreima Films and directed by Rako Prijanto, based on a script by Titien Watimena. The film stars Atiqah Hasiholan, Vino G. Bastian, Tuti Kirana, Marissa Anita, Mario Irwinsyah, Tissa Biani Azzahra, and Jajang C. Noer. It is based on the true story of Likas Tarigan, who later became known as Likas Gintings, wife of Let. Jend. Djamin Gintings.

This film received three nominations: "Best Film" at the 2014 Indonesian Film Festival, "Best Feature Film" at the 2014 Maya Awards, and "Favorite Movie" at the 2015 Indonesian Movie Awards.

Cast
Atiqah Hasiholan as Likas Tarigan/Likas Ginting
Vino G. Bastian as Djamin Ginting
Tutie Kirana as Old Likas
Marissa Anita as Hilda
Mario Irwinsyah as Mulia
Arswendi Nasution as Ngantari Tarigan
Jajang C. Noer as Tembun Tarigan
Ernest Samudra as Njore
Tissa Biani Azzahra as Little Likas
Anneke Jodi as Uni Mayar

Production
Rako Prijanto, Titien Wattimena, and producer Reza Hidayat began development of the film in December 2013. Research was conducted in Karo as to the customs, culture, and food of the region. The film covers a wide time period, the 1930s to the present. Some of the scenes in the film use dialogue in Karo language, and several of the cast took training in that language to get the correct dialects and accents.

Open casting took place for some of the roles. On April 20, 2014, Kastria Soldiana Elizabeth Hutagaol (finalist of 2013 Wajah Femina) was chosen as one of the child characters.

Filming process
3 Nafas Likas began filming on April 26, 2014, and took approximately two months. Filming took place on location in North Sumatra, Bakkara (Humbang Hasundutan Regency), Dolok Sanggul (Humbang Hasundutan Regency), Berastagi, Kabanjahe, Tebing Tinggi, Pamah Semilir, and the city of Medan. Other filming locations are Jakarta and Ottawa, Ontario, Canada.

One of the children of Djamin Gintings-Likas Gintings, Riahna Djamin Gintings, was an executive producer for this film.

Soundtrack
Tulus provided two songs for the soundtrack: a cover of "Untuk Ku" by Chrisye and an original song, entitled "Lekas".

Awards and nominations

References

External links
 3 Nafas Likas on Facebook
 3 Nafas Likas on Twitter

Indonesian drama films
2014 films
Films directed by Rako Prijanto
2014 drama films